A strong earthquake measuring magnitude  occurred in the Ionian Sea near the coasts of Greece during the night between 25 and 26 October 2018 at 22:54:51 UTC (01:54:51 in Greece). Sea level changes were predicted, and a tsunami advisory was issued. Reports of sea level change of up to 20 centimeters were reported in Greece and Italy.

The epicenter was located about 133 km from Patras. The earthquake occurred 14 km below the surface. Power outages were reported on the island of Zakynthos, and a 15th century monastery was also damaged on the islands of Strofades. The port of Zakynthos also sustained major damage, and a state of emergency was declared in the municipality. Services around Zakynthos were affected, and schools were closed on October 26. Tax relief was also extended into January in order to support the local tourism industry.

Other structures were damaged, but despite the magnitude of the event, there were no reported serious injuries or casualties. About 120 homes were left uninhabitable, and the town laterally shifted 5 centimeters as a result of the earthquake. A strict building code was cited as a possible reason for the limited amount of damage, as Zakynthos suffered major damage from a 1953 earthquake.

The event was felt in eight countries, including in the Balkans, Italy, Malta as well as coasts of Africa and Turkey.

The main shock was followed by multiple aftershocks in the following days, including undersea aftershocks of magnitude 4.4 and 5 over a week after the initial earthquake. The largest reported aftershock was of magnitude 5.6 the day of the initial earthquake.

References

Further reading
Efthimios Sokos, František Gallovič, Christos P. Evangelidis, Anna Serpetsidaki, Vladimír Plicka, Jan Kostelecký, Jiří Zahradník; The 2018 Mw 6.8 Zakynthos, Greece, Earthquake: Dominant Strike‐Slip Faulting near Subducting Slab. Seismological Research Letters doi: https://doi.org/10.1785/0220190169

Earthquakes in Greece
2018 in Greece
October 2018 events in Europe
2018 earthquakes
2018 tsunamis